Weatherbox is an American indie rock band from San Diego, California, United States, led by singer/songwriter Brian Warren and currently composed of Warren and varied touring members.

Discography
Weatherbox was originally signed to Doghouse Records, on which they released an EP (The Clearing) and two full-length records, American Art (2007) and The Cosmic Drama (2009). The band were most recently signed to Triple Crown Records under the label's Favorite Gentlemen imprint which was started by members of Manchester Orchestra in 2005. Their most recent LP is 'Flies in All Directions', which was released in May 2014.

Videography
 "Armed to the Teeth" (2007)
 "The Drugs" (2007)
 "The Clearing" (2009)
 "Pagan Baby" (2014)

2016
After touring the US in the spring of 2016, Weatherbox played their last show on Tuesday, August 16, 2016 at Che Café in La Jolla, CA.  However, there's speculation from some fans that they may play shows or continue writing at some later point in time, based on the title of their last show, "Goodbye For Now Show".  But as of Wednesday, August 17, 2016, Weatherbox is no longer a band.  The entire show was streamed live on Facebook and can be viewed on their page for all those who were not able to attend.

Late 2018, early 2019
After a hiatus, Brian Warren began posting to the Weatherbox Instagram in late 2018, with a special New Year's Eve show at the Soda Bar. Weatherbox then released a live video of a new song via Halfway Home called "Smelly" on February 11, 2019. The band's current plans are unknown.

References

External links
Weatherbox MySpace
Weatherbox Message Board
Doghouse records website
Weatherbox Interview at AbsolutePunk.net
Review for American Art on Punknews.org
Review for American Art on AbsolutePunk.net
Indie Fertility: 5 Local Bands to Listen to (San Diego Reader, 2012)

Indie rock musical groups from California
Musical groups established in 2005
Musical groups from San Diego
Triple Crown Records artists
Doghouse Records artists